Hussein Khalil Daher (born 15 March 1977) is a Lebanese former footballer who played as a defender.

Club career 
Daher joined Nejmeh's youth sector on 14 January 1994. He joined Lebanese Second Division side Khoyol in 2008.

Honours
Individual
 Lebanese Premier League Team of the Season: 1999–2000, 2003–04

References

External links
 
 
 

1977 births
Living people
Lebanese footballers
Association football defenders
Nejmeh SC players
Al Khoyol FC players
Lebanese Premier League players
Lebanese Second Division players
Lebanon international footballers